Ludwigia sphaerocarpa, common names globe-fruited false-loosestrife, globefruit primrose-willow, round-fruited false-loosestrife, globe-fruited seedbox, globe-fruited ludwigia, spherical-fruited seedbox  and round-fruited false loosestrife; is a plant found in North America. It is listed as endangered in Connecticut,
 
Indiana, Massachusetts and Rhode Island, and as threatened in Michigan and New York (state). It is listed as extirpated in Pennsylvania.

References

Flora of North America
sphaerocarpa
Taxa named by Stephen Elliott
Plants described in 1817